Pualas, officially the Municipality of Pualas (Maranao: Inged a Pualas), is a 5th class municipality in the province of Lanao del Sur, Philippines. According to the 2020 census, it has a population of 14,526 people.

History
On June 21, 1953, by the virtue of Executive Order No. 1516 Pualas was created with 39 barangay. By December 14, 1985, by the issuance of executive order no. 108 Only 23 were retained.

Geography

Barangays
Pualas is politically subdivided into 23 barangays.

 Badak
 Bantayan
 Basagad
 Bolinsong
 Boring
 Bualan
 Danugan
 Dapao
 Diamla
 Gadongan
 Ingud
 Linuk
 Lumbac
 Maligo
 Masao
 Notong
 Porug
 Romagondong
 Talambo (Poblacion)
 Tamlang
 Tuka
 Tomarompong
 Yaran

Climate

Demographics

Language
Maranao is the native language of Pualas. However, most of the inhabitants can speak Filipino, Cebuana, and English.

Religion
Pualas, which has a predominantly Muslim population.

Economy

Local Government

Pualas is governed primarily by the mayor, the vice mayor and the SB Members

Culture
Pualas has a predominantly Muslim populace wherein selling and distribution of alcoholic drinks, illegal drugs, and gambling is forbidden.

Education
Pualas National High School is a public High School Located at Barangay Talambo. It was founded in 1969. It offers education for junior and senior high school.

Gallery

References

External links

   Pualas Profile at the DTI Cities and Municipalities Competitive Index
 [ Philippine Standard Geographic Code]
Philippine Census Information
Local Governance Performance Management System

Municipalities of Lanao del Sur
Establishments by Philippine executive order